Borek is a municipality and village in Havlíčkův Brod District in the Vysočina Region of the Czech Republic. It has about 100 inhabitants.

Administrative parts
The village of Ostružno is an administrative part of Borek.

History
The first written mention of Borek is from 1557. Ostružno was first mentioned in 1397.

References

Villages in Havlíčkův Brod District